The flags of the U.S. states, territories, and the District of Columbia (Washington, D.C.) exhibit a variety of regional influences and local histories, as well as different styles and design principles. Modern U.S. state flags date from the turn of the 20th century, when states considered distinctive symbols for the 1893 World's Columbian Exposition in Chicago, Illinois. Most U.S. state flags were designed and adopted between 1893 and World War I.

The most recently adopted state flag is that of Mississippi, adopted on January 11, 2021, while the most recently adopted territorial flag is that of the Northern Mariana Islands, adopted on July 1, 1985. The flag of the District of Columbia was adopted in 1938. Recent legislation in Utah (2018–21) and Massachusetts (2021) has started the process of redesign for those state flags.

Despite a variety of designs, the majority of the states' flags share the same design pattern consisting of the state seal superimposed on a monochrome background, commonly a shade of blue, which remains a source of criticism from vexillologists. According to a 2001 survey by the North American Vexillological Association, New Mexico has the best-designed flag of any U.S. state, U.S. territory, or Canadian province, while Georgia's state flag was rated the worst (the latter of which has been changed since the survey was conducted).

Current state flags
Listed alphabetically with date of adoption.

Current federal district flag 
This is the current flag of the District of Columbia.

Current territory flags 
These are the current official flags of the five permanently inhabited territories of the United States. Dates in parenthesis denote when the territory's current flag was adopted by its respective political body.

Current state ensigns
Maine and Massachusetts have ensigns for use at sea.

Commemorative state flags
In 2021, Utah commemorated its 125th year anniversary as a state with a special flag, coinciding with the formation of a task force to redesign the state flag.

Historical state and territory flags

Former state flags

Former territory flags

American Civil War

Pre-Texan Revolution

Texan Revolution

California Republic

Other

Native American flags

Many Native American nations have tribal sovereignty, with jurisdiction over their members and reserved land. Although reservations are on state land, the laws of the state(s) do not necessarily apply. Below are the flags of some of the largest Indian tribes reservations by population and area:

Unofficial flags of atolls, reefs, and other islands
The U.S. national flag is the official flag for all islands, atolls, and reefs composing the United States Minor Outlying Islands. However, unofficial flags are sometimes used to represent some of the insular areas in the U.S. Minor Outlying Islands:

See also

 Flag of the United States
 Flags of governors of the U.S. states
 List of flags of the United States (including county, city and historical flags)
 List of U.S. state, district, and territorial insignia
 Flags of the Confederate States

Notes

References

External links 

 List of State Flags at State Symbols USA

Flags of country subdivisions
 
Lists of United States state insignia
States
United States state insignia